Ptolemy XI Alexander II (Ptolemaĩos Aléxandros) was a member of the Ptolemaic dynasty who ruled Egypt for a few days in 80 BC. He was a son of Ptolemy X Alexander I and Cleopatra Selene.

Biography
Ptolemy XI was born to Ptolemy X Alexander I and supposedly Cleopatra Selene.
His uncle Ptolemy IX Lathryos died in 81 BC or 80 BC, leaving only his sole legitimate daughter as his heir, and so Cleopatra Berenice (= Berenice III) ruled alone for a time. 
However, Rome's Sulla wanted a pro-Roman ruler on the throne, and sent the young son of Ptolemy X to Egypt, displaying Ptolemy Alexander's will in Rome as supposed justification for this obvious interference.

The will also apparently required Ptolemy XI to marry Berenice III, who was his stepmother, cousin, and possible half-sister. 
However, nineteen days after the marriage, Ptolemy murdered his bride for unknown reasons, an unwise move since Berenice was very popular; Ptolemy was soon lynched by the citizens of Alexandria.

He was succeeded by his cousin Ptolemy XII, an illegitimate son of Ptolemy IX.

Notes

References
Peter Green, Alexander to Actium (University of California Press, 1990), pp. 553–554

External links
 Ptolemy XI Alexander II entry in historical sourcebook by Mahlon H. Smith

2nd-century BC births
80 BC deaths
1st-century BC Pharaohs
1st-century BC murdered monarchs
Lynching deaths
Pharaohs of the Ptolemaic dynasty
1st-century BC rulers in Africa
1st-century BC Egyptian people